Lionnis Salazar Rubiera (born ) is a Cuban male volleyball player. He is part of the Cuba men's national volleyball team. On club level he plays for Santiago de Cuba. Since January 2023 he has been attending Centennial College in Toronto, Canada.

References

External links
 profile at FIVB.org

[

1997 births
Living people
Cuban men's volleyball players
Place of birth missing (living people)